Bistreshky Moastery or Monastery of  Saint Ivan Kasinets is medieval Bulgarian monastery located in Vratsa Province. Some of the frescoes in the church show that it was restored in the 16th century, but the establishment of the monastery dates back to the era of the Second Bulgarian Kingdom. There was a medieval fortress near the monastery—the fortress Kasina from the 12th to the 14th centuries. In 1822 the first printing workshop for icons in Bulgaria worked in the monastery.

References 

Bulgarian Orthodox monasteries